This is a list of international presidential trips made by Yoon Suk-yeol, the 13th President of South Korea. , Yoon Suk-yeol has made 5 presidential foreign trips to 9 countries since his inauguration on 10 May 2022.

Summary of presidential visits 
The number of visits per country where he travelled are:
One visit to Spain, United Kingdom, United States, Canada, Cambodia, Indonesia, United Arab Emirates, Switzerland, Japan

2022

2023

Future trips

Multilateral meetings
Yoon Suk-yeol is scheduled to attend the following summits as South Korean President.

See also
 List of international trips made by presidents of South Korea
 List of international presidential trips made by Moon Jae-in

References

Yoon Suk-yeol
Yoon Suk-yeol
Yoon Suk-yeol
2022 in international relations
Yoon Suk-yeol Government
Yoon Suk-yeol